Thalsamayam Oru Penkutty (A Girl On Live) is a 2012 Indian Malayalam satirical comedy drama film directed by T. K. Rajeev Kumar, starring Nithya Menon, Shweta Menon, and Unni Mukundan in the lead roles.

Cast

Nithya Menon as  Manjula Ayyappan a girl on live (Voice Dubbed By Nithuna Nevil Dinesh)
Shweta Menon as Zarina Programme Head of Real Tv (Voice By Vimmi Mariam George)
Unni Mukundan as Suryan
Sruthi Dileep as Priya
Manianpilla Raju as Ayyappan Teastall owner
K. P. A. C. Lalitha as a TV viewer 
Suraj Venjaramoodu as Young Business Man Shibulal
Siddique as Real TV CEO Surendra Menon
Tini Tom as Govindan congress party member
Devichandana as Sakhavu Bhavani a left sympathiser
Hima Shankar as Viewer, Neethu
Maya Moushmi as Advocate
Vanitha Krishnachandran
Baburaj as Thomas 
Binu Adimali as Kannan, the cameraman
Shruthy Menon as Sandhya
Kottayam Nazeer as himself (voice of cm)
Kalabhavan Navas as Gymman
Vinayakan as Alex
Neena Kurup
Harikeshan Thampi
Kochu Preman as Ajayan, Jogging Ammavan 
Vijayalakshmi as Jogging Ammavan wife
Susheelan as Sundaran, the auto-rickshaw driver
Baiju as SI Sathyaneshan
Baiju as Drunkard
Chembil Ashokan as Krishnankutty, Opposition leader
Aziz as a man at Ayyappan's teashop
Dinesh Panickar as Ananthapai 
Satheesh as a member of Thalsamayam Group
Vivek Gopan as Poovalan Kannan 
K. Madhu as himself
Subbalakshmi
Sreekala as Minister's wife

Soundtrack

Awards
Asianet Film Award
2012: Best Female Playback Singer - Ponnodu Poovayi

References

External links

2010s coming-of-age comedy-drama films
2010s Malayalam-language films
Indian coming-of-age comedy-drama films
2012 comedy-drama films
Films scored by Sharreth